Azotorrhea is the excessive discharge of nitrogenous substances in the feces or urine. As in when people eat a diet high in protein they may suffer from increased amount of amino acid byproduct (nitrogen) being broken and excreted through defecation or urination.

This condition may also be present in situations of pancreatic disease, such as in chronic alcoholism or cystic fibrosis.

References 

Nitrogen
Digestive diseases